Lieutenant Daring R.N. is a 1935 British adventure film directed by Reginald Denham and starring Hugh Williams, Geraldine Fitzgerald and Frederick Lloyd. It was made by Butcher's Film Service at Cricklewood Studios. It revived a popular character of the silent era, Lieutenant Bob Daring of the Royal Navy who featured in a series of productions made by British and Colonial Films.

Cast

References

External links

1935 films
British adventure films
1935 adventure films
Films directed by Reginald Denham
Films shot at Cricklewood Studios
Seafaring films
British black-and-white films
Remakes of British films
Sound film remakes of silent films
1930s English-language films
1930s British films
English-language adventure films